Two ships of the Royal Navy have been called HMS Sable after the small carnivorous mammal:

  was  launched in 1916 and sold in 1927.
  was another R-class destroyer, originally named  and also launched in 1916. The vessel was renamed HMS Sable in 1933 and arrived at Hayle for breaking up in March 1937.

References
 

Royal Navy ship names